is a Japanese manga series by Bow Ditama, which is also adapted into an anime television series of the same name that aired on the AT-X network in Japan from June 25 to September 10, 2009. It features anthropomorphized characters representing aspects of charging electrical equipment. The series contains some explicit fan service, including omorashi (panty wetting). An edited version of the series was released on Crunchyroll under the title of Charger Girl Ju-den Chan.

Plot
From a planet called "Life Core", which exists parallel to the normal human world, females known as "Jūden-chan" (charger girls) are patrolling the human world in search for individuals who feel depressed and unlucky. Their job is to charge these people up with the help of electricity in order to improve their mental states. While normally unseen by human eyes, one of these Jūden-chan, Plug Cryostat, accidentally meets a young man who is able to see her, because she was targeting his father (his sister in the anime). This series revolves around the various antics between the main characters and the quest for this Jūden-chan to improve herself.

Characters

Charger Girls (Jūden-Chans)
The Charger Girls are from a parallel world whose jobs at the Neodym company are to monitor the levels of depression in people. They are generally not seen or heard by humans, and are equipped with technology that allows them to phase through objects too. The people they monitor are ranked A through F based on their depression levels, with A being near suicidal. When a target ranked C or higher is spotted, the Jūden-chan pulls a giant plug from a nearby electrical source and charges them with positive energy.

She is a "Jūden-chan": someone from a world that's parallel to our own, capable of recharging people who are depressed or unlucky. Although, she's not very good at it, and is a bit of an airhead. Because she has the ability to use phasing, she normally can't be seen by the average human. This is done so she can do her job without causing distraction. She loves to watch a hentai series called "Miracle Witch Milly". While other Jūden-chan focus on charging people and getting paid, Plug focuses on discovering the root of their problems so that they won't become depressed again, and eventually learns to create these chances herself.

Plug's fellow Jūden-chan and rival, who, in the first 2 episodes, becomes her supervisor. She's rather serious when it comes to work, and is rather annoyed with how Plug does her job. In turn, Plug finds Arresta irritating for interfering with her work, and as a result, the two girls tend to fight a lot. She sometimes ends up crying, which Plug uses as blackmail material. Compared to Plug, Arresta is rather busty, which causes Plug to tease her.
She had feelings for Sento from the moment she saw him, but he is rather oblivious to this. Following their first meeting, Arresta seems to have garnered a fetish for being hit by a baseball bat.

The head of the organization that oversees the Jūden-chan and Rōden-chan. She has a fierce temper and constantly deducts from Plug's salary due to her incompetence. She does, however, have good judgment in her commands.

A Rōden-chan, aka Leakage Girl, who monitors activities such as electrical disturbances, and apprehends criminals suspected of harboring electricity for profit. They have more advanced equipment than the Jūden-chan, as well as specialized technology meant for apprehending criminals.

Another Rōden-chan, who often partners with Kuran. Both of them seem to take a liking to Sento after their first encounter with him.
 A fellow Jūden-chan from Plug's department, who's pretty similar to her in terms of personality, but still occasionally berates her when her pay gets cut.

A Jūden-chan who heads up the Samarium Cobalt company that Plug becomes a part of dedicated to charging targets in Africa. She's also in a lesbian relationship with another Jūden-chan, Tesla.

Another member of the Samarium Cobalt company, and Waver's lover.

Another member of the Samarium Cobalt company, who has freckles on her cheeks.

Another member of the Samarium Cobalt company, who has messy hair and is generally sleepy.

Humans

A young man who is the only human capable of seeing both Plug and Arresta. He works at a family restaurant but has a rather short temper, and tends to frequently hit Plug (and at times Arresta as well) with a baseball bat or whatever is within reach; this has become a running gag in the series. He occasionally helps Plug and Arresta with their work, teaching Plug that the best way to find an opportunity to charge is to make one yourself. He lives with his younger sister, and he's capable of absorbing the counter-current of Kenta Kajiwara, the Z-class boy.

Sento's younger sister. She lives with her older brother and wants to do household chores so that she can feel useful, but Sento told her not to because he feels responsible for her. She cares for her brother and is frustrated that she is not allowed to help him, making her depressed and unhappy (and a prime target for Plug). She starts the series a third year junior high student, before moving on to her first year in high school.

Pink hair, put into twin tails. Hakone's childhood friend. She has a crush on Sento, whom she calls "Sen-nii", and is struggling to confess to him, but Sento seems to be unaware of it and only thinks of her as a little sister, much to her frustration. Later on in the manga, she gains the ability to see and touch Jūden-chan. She starts the series as a second year high school student, and later enters her third year.
Kenta Kajiwara
A young boy who became worried about the prospect of bullies at school, due to the effects of Rona Elmo. He is called a Z rank since the counter-current he gives off to Jūden-chan trying to charge him is too powerful. Nonetheless, Plug became determined to save him, even at the risk of burning her arms off.

Sento's well-endowed boss at a family diner he works at. She appears to have a lolita complex and takes interest in young girls, particularly Hakone.

Sento's and Hakone's father. While absent in the anime, he appears in the first chapter of the manga in place of Hakone. The berating he received from Sento for being a poor father caused him to reach a level higher than A, which would cause his heart to fail if left alone. With Plug's help, he is saved.

Other characters

A Hōden-chan (discharger girl) that saps away positive energy from people. She hates being alone, and since no one in the human world can see her, she treats everyone like toys. Despite her small appearance, she is very powerful, being able to defeat Rōden-chan at the snap of her finger.

The founder and president of the Neodym company.

A magical girl from a rather perverted television show called "Miracle Witch Milly" that seems to be aired at whatever time of day is convenient. Partnered with her insulting sidekick Bitch , she goes against her arch rival, Bloody Selica , generally having her clothes removed in the process. In the end though, she falls in love with Selica and they become lovers instead of rivals.

An original character who appears in the PSP game.

Terminology

Charger girls. Their job is to monitor depression levels in people. They are generally unseen by normal people, and can adjust their stealth levels to avoid being touched as well. People they monitor are ranked A - F depending on how depressed they are, F being the lowest and A being the highest, possibly leading to suicide. When a C rank or higher target is found, a Jūden-chan pulls out a giant plug from a nearby electrical source, and charge them with electricity to make them more energetic. How they go about their energetic way depends on what they are thinking of when they are charged.

Leakage girls. Their job is to investigate cases in which electricity is stolen and illegally sold on the black market. They have more advanced equipment than the Jūden-chan, including several gadgets used for apprehending suspects.

Discharger girls. These girls do the exact opposite of Jūden-chan, and are able to steal a person's energy and increase their depression levels greatly in an instant. They can use the energy they steal for profit.

Media

Manga

The manga began serialization in Comic Gum magazine from June 24, 2006. Ten tankōbon volumes were released as for October 26, 2013.

Anime

The anime series, produced by Studio Hibari, aired on the cable/satellite channel AT-X between June 25, 2009 and September 10, 2009. Crunchyroll worked with avex entertainment on an edited version which censors some of the nudity and urination for UHF broadcast. This version was streamed on Crunchyroll under the title Charger Girl Ju-den Chan.

Media Blasters have licensed the series in North America and released it on DVD, in Japanese language with English subtitles, June 25, 2013. The series premiered on Toku in the United States on December 31, 2015. This show was also dubbed into Spanish, and distributed on the Ultra Macho network.

Episode list

Bonus episodes
Extra short episodes are featured in the DVD releases of the series, featuring more explicit content than the broadcast show.

Video game
A visual novel developed by Russell entitled  was released for the PlayStation Portable on May 27, 2010 in Japan.

References

External links
 Anime official website 
 

2006 manga
2009 Japanese television series endings
Anime series based on manga
AT-X (TV network) original programming
Media Blasters
Seinen manga
Studio Hibari
Wani Books manga
Works about depression